The Western world, also known as the West, primarily refers to various nations and states in the regions of Australasia, Europe, and the Americas. The Western world likewise is called the Occident (from Latin occidēns: "setting down, sunset, west"), in contrast to the Eastern world known as the Orient (from Latin oriēns: "origin, sunrise, east"). The West is considered an evolving concept; made up of cultural, political, and economic synergy among diverse groups of people, and not a rigid region with fixed borders and members. Definitions for "Western world" vary according to context and perspectives.

Modern-day Western world essentially encompasses the nations and states where civilization or culture is considered as Western—the roots of which some historians trace back to the Greco-Roman world. In the Global North–South schism, the West is often correlated with Global North.
 A historic idea of Europe as the West emerged in fifth century BCE Greece. 
 A geographical concept of the West started to take shape in 4th century CE when Constantine–the first Christian Roman emperor divided the Roman Empire between the Greek East and Latin West. The East Roman Empire, later called the Byzantine Empire, continued for a millennium, while the West Roman Empire lasted for only about a century and a half. This caused people in the Latin West to envy the Greek east and consider the Christians over there as heretics, eventually leading to the East–West Schism in 1054 CE. Even though friendly relations continued between the two parts of the Christendom for sometime, the crusades made the schism definitive with hostility. The West during these crusades tried to capture trade routes to the East, failing in which, it instead discovered the Americas. In the aftermath of European colonization of these newly discovered lands, an idea of the Western world, as an inheritor of Latin Christendom emerged.

The English word "West" was initially meant an adverb for direction. By the Middle Ages, Europeans began to use it to describe Europe. Since the eighteenth century, following European exploration, the word was used to indicate the regions of the world with European settlements. 
In contemporary times, countries that are considered to constitute the West vary according to perspective rather than their geographical location. Countries like Australia and New Zealand, located in the Eastern Hemisphere are included in modern definitions of the Western world, as these regions and others like them are significantly influenced by the British—derived from colonization, and immigration of Europeans—factors that grounded such countries to the West. Despite being located in the Far East, a country like Japan, in some contexts, is considered a part of the West, as it aligns to the ideals of Western-style democracy; while a country like Cuba, located in the Western Hemisphere, is argued as not being a part of the West, as it aligns to the ideals of socialism and communism.
Depending on the context and the historical period in question, Russia was sometimes seen as a part of the West, and at other times, juxtaposed with it. 
Running parallel to the rise of the United States as a great power and the development of communication–transportation technologies "shrinking" the distance between both the Atlantic Ocean shores, the aforementioned country became more prominently featured in the conceptualizations of the West.

Since the late 1960s, the Western world has been noted for its diversity. Earlier, many prominent western countries were once envisioned as homelands for whites. Racism was cited to have been a contributing factor in the Westerners colonialism. Westerners have historically justified colonialism with the values of individualism and enlightenment. The West is also recognised for its individualist and, increasingly, irreligious sentiments; following the Age of Enlightenment and the French Revolution, inquisitions were abolished in the 19th and 20th centuries, hastening the separation of church and state, and secularization of the Western world where unchurched spirituality is gaining prominence over organized religion since the mid-20th century. Women in the West are considered to be the liberated and independent subjects compared to women in 'other cultures'. Feminism is often criticized for being inherently white and western. Transformed from a directional concept to a socio-political concept, the idea of the West was temporalized and rendered as a concept of the future bestowed with notions of progress and modernity.

Introduction 
Western civilized society is considered to have developed from Western culture influenced by many older civilizations of the ancient Near East, such as Canaan, Minoan Crete, Sumer, Babylonia, and also Ancient Egypt. It originated in the Mediterranean basin and its vicinity; Ancient Greece and Ancient Rome are generally considered to be the birthplaces of Western civilization—Greece having heavily influenced Rome—the former due to its impact on philosophy, democracy, science, aesthetics, as well as building designs and proportions and architecture; the latter due to its influence on art, law, warfare, governance, republicanism, engineering and religion. Western civilization is also strongly associated with Christianity (and to a lesser extent, with Judaism), which is in turn shaped by Hellenistic philosophy and Roman culture. In the modern era, Western culture has been heavily influenced by the Renaissance, the Ages of Discovery and Enlightenment and the Industrial and Scientific Revolutions. Through extensive imperialism, colonialism and Christianization by some Western powers in the 15th to 20th centuries and later exportation of mass culture, much of the rest of the world has been extensively influenced by Western culture, in a phenomenon often called Westernization.

Historians, such as Carroll Quigley in "The Evolution of Civilizations", contend that Western civilization was born around AD 500, after the total collapse of the Western Roman Empire, leaving a vacuum for new ideas to flourish that were impossible in Classical societies. In either view, between the fall of the Western Roman Empire and the Renaissance, the West (or those regions that would later become the heartland of the culturally "western sphere") experienced a period of first, considerable decline, and then readaptation, reorientation and considerable renewed material, technological and political development.

Classical culture of the ancient Western world was partly preserved during this period due to the survival of the Eastern Roman Empire and the introduction of the Catholic Church; it was also greatly expanded by the Arab importation of both the Ancient Greco-Roman and new technology through the Arabs from India and China to Europe.

Since the Renaissance, the West evolved beyond the influence of the ancient Greeks and Romans and the Islamic world, due to the successful Second Agricultural, Commercial, Scientific, and Industrial revolutions (propellers of modern banking concepts). The West rose further with the 18th century's Age of Enlightenment and through the Age of Exploration's expansion of peoples of Western and Central European empires, particularly the globe-spanning colonial empires of 18th and 19th centuries. Numerous times, this expansion was accompanied by Catholic missionaries, who attempted to proselytize Christianity.

There is debate among some as to whether Latin America as a whole is in a category of its own.

Culture

Historical divisions

The West of the Mediterranean Region during the Antiquity
The geopolitical divisions in Europe that created a concept of East and West originated in the ancient tyrannical and imperialistic Graeco-Roman times. The Eastern Mediterranean was home to the highly urbanized cultures that had Greek as their common language (owing to the older empire of Alexander the Great and of the Hellenistic successors.), whereas the West was much more rural in its character and more readily adopted Latin as its common language. After the fall of the Western Roman Empire and the beginning of the Medieval times (or Middle Ages), Western and Central Europe were substantially cut off from the East where Byzantine Greek culture and Eastern Christianity became founding influences in the Eastern European world such as the East and South Slavic peoples.

Roman Catholic Western and Central Europe, as such, maintained a distinct identity particularly as it began to redevelop during the Renaissance. Even following the Protestant Reformation, Protestant Europe continued to see itself as more tied to Roman Catholic Europe than other parts of the perceived civilized world.
Use of the term West as a specific cultural and geopolitical term developed over the course of the Age of Exploration as Europe spread its culture to other parts of the world. Roman Catholics were the first major religious group to immigrate to the New World, as settlers in the colonies of Spain and Portugal (and later, France) belonged to that faith. English and Dutch colonies, on the other hand, tended to be more religiously diverse. Settlers to these colonies included Anglicans, Dutch Calvinists, English Puritans and other nonconformists, English Catholics, Scottish Presbyterians, French Huguenots, German and Swedish Lutherans, as well as Quakers, Mennonites, Amish, and Moravians.

Ancient Greek and Hellenistic worlds (13th–1st centuries BC)

Ancient Greek civilization had been growing in the first millennium BC into wealthy poleis, so-called city-states (geographically loose political entities which in time, inevitably end giving way to larger organisations of society, including the empire and the nation-state) such as Athens, Sparta, Thebes, and Corinth, by Middle and Near Eastern ones (Sumerian cities such as Uruk and Ur; Ancient Egyptian city-states, such as Thebes and Memphis; the Phoenician Tyre and Sidon; the five Philistine city-states; the Berber city-states of the Garamantes).

The then Hellenic division between the barbarians (term used by Ancient Greeks for all non-Greek-speaking people) and the Greeks contrasted in many societies the Greek-speaking culture of the Greek settlements around the Mediterranean to the surrounding non-Greek cultures. Herodotus considered the Persian Wars of the early 5th century BC a conflict of Europa versus Asia (which he considered all land north and east of the Sea of Marmara, respectively). The Greeks would highlight what they perceived as a lack of freedom in the Persian world, something that they viewed as antithetical to their culture.

According to a few writers, the future conquest of parts of the Roman Empire by Germanic peoples and the subsequent dominance by the Western Christian Papacy (which held combined political and spiritual authority, a state of affairs absent from Greek civilization in all its stages), resulted in a rupture of the previously existing ties between the Latin West and Greek thought, including Christian Greek thought.

Ancient Roman world (6th century BC – AD 395–476)

Ancient Rome (6th century BC – AD 476) is a term to describe the ancient Roman society that conquered Central Italy assimilating the Italian Etruscan culture, growing from the Latium region since about the 8th century BC, to a massive empire straddling the Mediterranean Sea. In its 10-centuries territorial expansion, Roman civilization shifted from a small monarchy (753–509 BC), to a republic (509–27 BC), into an autocratic empire (27 BC – AD 476). Its Empire came to dominate Western, Central and Southeastern Europe, Northern Africa and, becoming an autocratic Empire a vast Middle Eastern area, when it ended. Conquest was enforced using the Roman legions and then through cultural assimilation by eventual recognition of some form of Roman citizenship's privileges. Nonetheless, despite its great legacy, a number of factors led to the eventual decline and ultimately fall of the Roman Empire.

The Roman Empire succeeded the approximately 500-year-old Roman Republic ( 510–30 BC). In 350 years, from the successful and deadliest war with the Phoenicians began in 218 BC to the rule of Emperor Hadrian by AD 117, Ancient Rome expanded up to twenty-five times its area. The same time passed before its fall in AD 476. Rome had expanded long before the empire reached its zenith with the conquest of Dacia in AD 106 (modern-day Romania) under Emperor Trajan. From the time of Caesar (100–44 BC) to the Fall of the Western Roman Empire, Rome dominated Southern Europe, the Mediterranean coast of Northern Africa and the Levant, including the ancient trade routes with population living outside. Ancient Rome has contributed greatly to the development of law, war, art, literature, architecture, technology and language in the Western world, and its history continues to have a major influence on the world today. Latin language has been the base from which Romance languages evolved and it has been the official language of the Catholic Church and all Catholic religious ceremonies all over Europe until 1967, as well as an or the official language of countries such as Italy and Poland (9th–18th centuries).

In AD 395, a few decades before its Western collapse, the Roman Empire formally split into a Western and an Eastern one, each with their own emperors, capitals, and governments, although ostensibly they still belonged to one formal Empire. The Western Roman Empire provinces eventually were replaced by Northern European Germanic ruled kingdoms in the 5th century due to civil wars, corruption, and devastating Germanic invasions from such tribes as the Huns, Goths, the Franks and the Vandals by their late expansion throughout Europe. The three-day Visigoths's AD 410 sack of Rome who had been raiding Greece not long before, a shocking time for Graeco-Romans, was the first time after almost 800 years that Rome had fallen to a foreign enemy, and St. Jerome, living in Bethlehem at the time, wrote that "The City which had taken the whole world was itself taken." There followed the sack of AD 455 lasting 14 days, this time conducted by the Vandals, retaining Rome's eternal spirit through the Holy See of Rome (the Latin Church) for centuries to come. The ancient Barbarian tribes, often composed of well-trained Roman soldiers paid by Rome to guard the extensive borders, had become militarily sophisticated 'romanized barbarians', and mercilessly slaughtered the Romans conquering their Western territories while looting their possessions.

The Roman Empire is where the idea of "the West" began to emerge.

The Eastern Roman Empire, governed from Constantinople, is usually referred to as the Byzantine Empire after AD 476, the traditional date for the fall of the Roman Empire and beginning of the Early Middle Ages. The Eastern Roman Empire surviving the fall of the Western protected Roman legal and cultural traditions, combining them with Greek and Christian elements, for another thousand years more. The name Byzantine Empire was first used centuries later, after the Byzantine Empire ended.
The dissolution of the Western half, nominally ended in AD 476, but in truth a long process that ended by the rise of Catholic Gaul (modern-day France) ruling from around the year AD 800, left only the Eastern Roman Empire alive. The Eastern half continued to think of itself as the Eastern Roman Empire for a while until AD 610–800, when Latin ceased to be the official language of the empire. The inhabitants calling themselves Romans was because the term "Roman" was meant to signify all Christians. The Pope crowned Charlemagne as Emperor of the Romans of the newly established Holy Roman Empire and the West began thinking in terms of Western Latins living in the old Western Empire, and Eastern Greeks (those inside the Roman remnant of the old Eastern Empire).

The birth of the European West during the Middle Ages

In the early 4th century, the central focus of power was on two apart Imperial (including army generals') legacies, within the Roman Empire: the older Aegean Sea Greek heritage (of Classical Greece) in the Eastern Mediterranean, and the newer most successful Tyrrhenian Sea Latin heritage (of Ancient Latium and Tuscany) in the Western Mediterranean. Constantine the Great's decision to establish the city of Constantinople (today's Istanbul) in modern-day Turkey as the "New Rome" when he picked it as capital of his Empire (later called "Byzantine Empire" by modern historians) in 330 AD, was a turning point.

This internal conflict of legacies had possibly emerged since the assassination of Julius Caesar three centuries earlier, when Roman Imperialism had just been born with the Roman Republic becoming "Roman Empire", but reached its zenith during 3rd century's many internal civil wars. This is the time when the Huns (part of the ancient Eastern European tribes named barbarians by the Romans) from modern-day Hungary penetrated into the Dalmatian (modern-day Croatia) region then originating in the following 150 years in the Roman Empire officially splitting in two halves. Also the time of the formal acceptance of Christianity as Empire's religious policy, when the Emperors began actively banning and fighting previous pagan religions.

The Eastern Roman Empire included lands south-west of the Black Sea and bordering on the Eastern Mediterranean and parts of the Adriatic Sea. This division into Eastern and Western Roman Empires was later reflected in the administration of the Roman Catholic and Eastern Greek Orthodox churches, with Rome and Constantinople debating over whether either city was the capital of Western religion.

As the Eastern (Orthodox) and Western (Catholic) churches spread their influence, the line between Eastern and Western Christianity was moving. Its movement was affected by the influence of the Byzantine empire and the fluctuating power and influence of the Catholic church in Rome. The geographic line of religious division approximately followed a line of cultural divide. The influential American conservative political scientist, adviser and academic Samuel P. Huntington argued that this cultural division still existed during the Cold War as the approximate Western boundary of those countries that were allied with the Soviet Union.

In AD 800 under Charlemagne, the Early Medieval Franks established an empire that was recognized by the Pope in Rome as the Holy Roman Empire (Latin Christian revival of the ancient Roman Empire, under perpetual Germanic rule from AD 962) inheriting ancient Roman Empire's prestige but offending the Eastern Roman Emperor in Constantinople, and leading to the Crusades and the east–west schism. The crowning of the Emperor by the Pope led to the assumption that the highest power was the papal hierarchy, quintessential Roman Empire's spiritual heritage authority, establishing then, until the Protestant Reformation, the civilization of Western Christendom.

The Latin Rite Catholic Church of western and central Europe split with the eastern Greek-speaking Patriarchates in the Christian East–West Schism, also known as the "Great Schism", during the Gregorian Reforms (calling for a more central status of the Roman Catholic Church Institution), three months after Pope Leo IX's death in April 1054. Following the 1054 Great Schism, both the Western Church and Eastern Church continued to consider themselves uniquely orthodox and catholic. Augustine wrote in On True Religion: "Religion is to be sought... only among those who are called Catholic or orthodox Christians, that is, guardians of truth and followers of right." Over time, the Western Church gradually identified with the "Catholic" label, and people of Western Europe gradually associated the "Orthodox" label with the Eastern Church (although in some languages the "Catholic" label is not necessarily identified with the Western Church). This was in note of the fact that both Catholic and Orthodox were in use as ecclesiastical adjectives as early as the 2nd and 4th centuries respectively. Meanwhile, the extent of both Christendoms expanded, as Germanic peoples, Bohemia, Poland, Hungary, Scandinavia, Finnic peoples, Baltic peoples, British Isles and the other non-Christian lands of the northwest were converted by the Western Church, while Eastern Slavic peoples, Bulgaria, Serbia, Montenegro, Russian territories, Vlachs and Georgia were converted by the Eastern Church.

In 1071, the Byzantine army was defeated by the Muslim Turco-Persians of medieval Asia, resulting in the loss of most of Asia Minor. The situation was a serious threat to the future of the Eastern Orthodox Byzantine Empire. The Emperor sent a plea to the Pope in Rome to send military aid to restore the lost territories to Christian rule. The result was a series of western European military campaigns into the eastern Mediterranean, known as the Crusades. Unfortunately for the Byzantines, the crusaders (belonging to the members of nobility from France, German territories, the Low countries, England, Italy and Hungary) had no allegiance to the Byzantine Emperor and established their own states in the conquered regions, including the heart of the Byzantine Empire.

The Holy Roman Empire would dissolve on 6 August 1806, after the French Revolution and the creation of the Confederation of the Rhine by Napoleon.

The decline of the Byzantine Empire (13th–15th centuries) began with the Latin Christian Fourth Crusade in AD 1202–04, considered to be one of the most important events, solidifying the schism between the Christian churches of Greek Byzantine Rite and Latin Roman Rite. An anti-Western riot in 1182 broke out in Constantinople targeting Latins. The extremely wealthy (after previous Crusades) Venetians in particular made a successful attempt to maintain control over the coast of Catholic present-day Croatia (specifically the Dalmatia, a region of interest to the maritime medieval Venetian Republic moneylenders and its rivals, such as the Republic of Genoa) rebelling against the Venetian economic domination. What followed dealt an irrevocable blow to the already weakened Byzantine Empire with the Crusader army's sack of Constantinople in April 1204, capital of the Greek Christian-controlled Byzantine Empire, described as one of the most profitable and disgraceful sacks of a city in history. This paved the way for Muslim conquests in present-day Turkey and the Balkans in the coming centuries (only a handful of the Crusaders followed to the stated destination thereafter, the Holy Land). The geographical identity of the Balkans is historically known as a crossroads of cultures, a juncture between the Latin and Greek bodies of the Roman Empire, the destination of a massive influx of pagans (meaning "non-Christians") Bulgars and Slavs, an area where Catholic and Orthodox Christianity met, as well as the meeting point between Islam and Christianity. The Papal Inquisition was established in AD 1229 on a permanent basis, run largely by clergymen in Rome, and abolished six centuries later. Before AD 1100, the Catholic Church suppressed what they believed to be heresy, usually through a system of ecclesiastical proscription or imprisonment, but without using torture, and seldom resorting to executions.

This very profitable Central European Fourth Crusade had prompted the 14th century Renaissance (translated as 'Rebirth') of Italian city-states including the Papal States, on eve of the Protestant Reformation and Counter-Reformation (which established the Roman Inquisition to succeed the Medieval Inquisition). There followed the discovery of the American continent, and consequent dissolution of West Christendom as even a theoretical unitary political body, later resulting in the religious Eighty Years War (1568–1648) and Thirty Years War (1618–1648) between various Protestant and Catholic states of the Holy Roman Empire (and emergence of religiously diverse confessions). In this context, the Protestant Reformation (1517) may be viewed as a schism within the Catholic Church. German monk Martin Luther, in the wake of precursors, broke with the pope and with the emperor by the Catholic Church's abusive commercialization of indulgences in the Late Medieval Period, backed by many of the German princes and helped by the development of the printing press, in an attempt to reform corruption within the church.

Both these religious wars ended with the Peace of Westphalia (1648), which enshrined the concept of the nation-state, and the principle of absolute national sovereignty in international law. As European influence spread across the globe, these Westphalian principles, especially the concept of sovereign states, became central to international law and to the prevailing world order.

Expansion of the West: the Era of Colonialism (15th–20th centuries)

In the 13th and 14th centuries, a number of European travelers, many of them Christian missionaries, had sought to cultivate trading with Asia and Africa. With the Crusades came the relative contraction of the Orthodox Byzantine's large silk industry in favour of Catholic Western Europe and the rise of Western Papacy. The most famous of these merchant travelers pursuing East–west trade was Venetian Marco Polo. But these journeys had little permanent effect on east–west trade because of a series of political developments in Asia in the last decades of the 14th century, which put an end to further European exploration of Asia: namely the new Ming rulers were found to be unreceptive of religious proselytism by European missionaries and merchants. Meanwhile, the Ottoman Turks consolidated control over the eastern Mediterranean, closing off key overland trade routes.

The Portuguese spearheaded the drive to find oceanic routes that would provide cheaper and easier access to South and East Asian goods, by advancements in maritime technology such as the caravel ship introduced in the mid-1400s. The charting of oceanic routes between East and West began with the unprecedented voyages of Portuguese and Spanish sea captains. In 1492 European colonialism expanded across the globe with the exploring voyage of merchant, navigator, and Hispano-Italian colonizer Christopher Columbus. Such voyages were influenced by medieval European adventurers after the European spice trade with Asia, who had journeyed overland to the Far East contributing to geographical knowledge of parts of the Asian continent. They are of enormous significance in Western history as they marked the beginning of the European exploration, colonization and exploitation of the American continents and their native inhabitants. The European colonization of the Americas led to the Atlantic slave trade between the 1490s and the 1800s, which also contributed to the development of African intertribal warfare and racist ideology. Before the abolition of its slave trade in 1807, the British Empire alone (which had started colonial efforts in 1578, almost a century after Portuguese and Spanish empires) was responsible for the transportation of 3.5 million African slaves to the Americas, a third of all slaves transported across the Atlantic. The Holy Roman Empire was dissolved in 1806 by the French Revolutionary Wars; abolition of the Roman Catholic Inquisition followed.

Due to the reach of these empires, Western institutions expanded throughout the world. This process of influence (and imposition) began with the voyages of discovery, colonization, conquest, and exploitation of Portugal enforced as well by papal bulls in 1450s (by the fall of the Byzantine Empire), granting Portugal navigation, war and trade monopoly for any newly discovered lands, and competing Spanish navigators. It continued with the rise of the Dutch East India Company by the destabilising Spanish discovery of the New World, and the creation and expansion of the English and French colonial empires, and others. Even after demands for self-determination from subject peoples within Western empires were met with decolonization, these institutions persisted. One specific example was the requirement that post-colonial societies were made to form nation-states (in the Western tradition), which often created arbitrary boundaries and borders that did not necessarily represent a whole nation, people, or culture (as in much of Africa), and are often the cause of international conflicts and friction even to this day. Although not part of Western colonization process proper, following the Middle Ages Western culture in fact entered other global-spanning cultures during the colonial 15th–20th centuries.

The concepts of a world of nation-states born by the Peace of Westphalia in 1648, coupled with the ideologies of the Enlightenment, the coming of modernity, the Scientific Revolution and the Industrial Revolution, would produce powerful social transformations, political and economic institutions that have come to influence (or been imposed upon) most nations of the world today. Historians agree that the Industrial Revolution has been one of the most important events in history.

The course of three centuries since Christopher Columbus' late 15th century's voyages, of deportation of slaves from Africa and British dominant northern-Atlantic location, later developed into modern-day United States of America, evolving from the ratification of the Constitution of the United States by thirteen States on the North American East Coast before end of the 18th century.

In the early-19th century, the systematic urbanisation process (migration from villages in search of jobs in manufacturing centers) had begun, and the concentration of labour into factories led to the rise in the population of the towns. World population had been rising as well. It is estimated to have first reached one billion in 1804. Also, the new philosophical movement later known as Romanticism originated, in the wake of the previous Age of Reason of the 1600s and the Enlightenment of 1700s. These are seen as fostering the 19th century Western world'''s sustained economic development. Before the urbanisation and industrialization of the 1800s, demand for oriental goods such as porcelain, silk, spices and tea remained the driving force behind European imperialism in Asia, and (with the important exception of British East India Company rule in India) the European stake in Asia remained confined largely to trading stations and strategic outposts necessary to protect trade. Industrialisation, however, dramatically increased European demand for Asian raw materials; and the severe Long Depression of the 1870s provoked a scramble for new markets for European industrial products and financial services in Africa, the Americas, Eastern Europe, and especially in Asia (Western powers exploited their advantages in China for example by the Opium Wars). This resulted in the "New Imperialism", which saw a shift in focus from trade and indirect rule to formal colonial control of vast overseas territories ruled as political extensions of their mother countries. The later years of the 19th century saw the transition from "informal imperialism" (hegemony) by military influence and economic dominance, to direct rule (a revival of colonial imperialism) in the African continent and Middle East.

During the socioeconomically optimistic and innovative decades of the Second Industrial Revolution between the 1870s and 1914, also known as the "Beautiful Era", the established colonial powers in Asia (United Kingdom, France, Netherlands) added to their empires also vast expanses of territory in the Indian Subcontinent and South East Asia. Japan was involved primarily during the Meiji period (1868–1912), though earlier contacts with the Portuguese, Spaniards and Dutch were also present in the Japanese Empire's recognition of the strategic importance of European nations. Traditional Japanese society became an industrial and militarist power like the Western British Empire and the French Third Republic, and similar to the German Empire.

At the close of the Spanish–American War in 1898 the Philippines, Puerto Rico, Guam and Cuba were ceded to the United States under the terms of the Treaty of Paris. The US quickly emerged as the new imperial power in East Asia and in the Pacific Ocean area. The Philippines continued to fight against colonial rule in the Philippine–American War.

By 1913, the British Empire held sway over 412 million people,  of the world population at the time, and by 1920, it covered ,  of the Earth's total land area. At its apex, the phrase "the empire on which the sun never sets" described the British Empire, because its expanse around the globe meant that the sun always shone on at least one of its territories. As a result, its political, legal, linguistic and cultural legacy is widespread throughout the Western World. In the aftermath of the Second World War, decolonizing efforts were employed by all Western powers under United Nations (ex-League of Nations) international directives. Most of colonized nations received independence by 1960. Great Britain showed ongoing responsibility for the welfare of its former colonies as member states of the Commonwealth of Nations. But the end of Western colonial imperialism saw the rise of Western neocolonialism or economic imperialism. Multinational corporations came to offer "a dramatic refinement of the traditional business enterprise", through "issues as far ranging as national sovereignty, ownership of the means of production, environmental protection, consumerism, and policies toward organized labor." Though the overt colonial era had passed, Western nations, as comparatively rich, well-armed, and culturally powerful states, wielded a large degree of influence throughout the world, and with little or no sense of responsibility toward the peoples impacted by its multinational corporations in their exploitation of minerals and markets.R. Vernon, Sovereignty at Bay: the Multinational Spread of U.S. Enterprises (1971). The dictum of Alfred Thayer Mahan is shown to have lasting relevance, that whoever controls the seas controls the world.

 Enlightenment (17th–18th centuries) 

Eric Voegelin described the 18th-century as one where "the sentiment grows that one age has come to its close and that a new age of Western civilization is about to be born". According to Voeglin the Enlightenment (also called the Age of Reason) represents the "atrophy of Christian transcendental experiences and [seeks] to enthrone the Newtonian method of science as the only valid method of arriving at truth". Its precursors were John Milton and Baruch Spinoza. Meeting Galileo in 1638 left an enduring impact on John Milton and influenced Milton's great work Areopagitica, where he warns that, without free speech, inquisitorial forces will impose "an undeserved thraldom upon learning".

The achievements of the 17th century included the invention of the telescope and acceptance of heliocentrism. 18th century scholars continued to refine Newton's theory of gravitation, notably Leonhard Euler, Pierre Louis Maupertuis, Alexis-Claude Clairaut, Jean Le Rond d'Alembert, Joseph-Louis Lagrange, Pierre-Simon de Laplace. Laplace's five-volume Treatise on Celestial Mechanics is one of the great works of 18th-century Newtonianism. Astronomy gained in prestige as new observatories were funded by governments and more powerful telescopes developed, leading to the discovery of new planets, asteroids, nebulae and comets, and paving the way for improvements in navigation and cartography. Astronomy became the second most popular scientific profession, after medicine.

A common metanarrative of the Enlightenment is the "secularization theory". Modernity, as understood within the framework, means a total break with the past. Innovation and science are the good, representing the modern values of rationalism, while faith is ruled by superstition and traditionalism. Inspired by the Scientific Revolution, the Enlightenment embodied the ideals of improvement and progress. Descartes and Isaac Newton were regarded as exemplars of human intellectual achievement. Condorcet wrote about the progress of humanity in the Sketch of the Progress of the Human Mind (1794), from primitive society to agrarianism, the invention of writing, the later invention of the printing press and the advancement to "the Period when the Sciences and Philosophy threw off the Yoke of Authority".
 
French writer Pierre Bayle denounced Spinoza as a pantheist (thereby accusing him of atheism). Bayle's criticisms garnered much attention for Spinoza. The pantheism controversy in the late 18th century saw Gotthold Lessing attacked by Friedrich Heinrich Jacobi over support for Spinoza's pantheism. Lessing was defended by Moses Mendelssohn, although Mendelssohn diverged from pantheism to follow Gottfried Wilhelm Leibniz in arguing that God and the world were not of the same substance (equivalency). Spinoza was excommunicated from the Dutch Sephardic community, but for Jews who sought out Jewish sources to guide their own path to secularism, Spinoza was as important as Voltaire and Kant.

 Cold War (1947–1991) 

During the Cold War, a new definition emerged. Earth was divided into three "worlds". The First World, analogous in this context to what was called the West, was composed of NATO members and other countries aligned with the United States.

The Second World was the Eastern bloc in the Soviet sphere of influence, including the Soviet Union (15 republics including the then-occupied and presently independent Estonia, Latvia, Lithuania) and Warsaw Pact countries like Poland, Bulgaria, Hungary, Romania, East Germany (now united with Germany), and Czechoslovakia (now split into the Czech Republic and Slovakia).

The Third World consisted of countries, many of which were unaligned with either, and important members included India, Yugoslavia, Finland (Finlandization) and Switzerland (Swiss Neutrality); some include the People's Republic of China, though this is disputed, since the People's Republic of China, as communist, had friendly relations—at certain times—with the Soviet bloc, and had a significant degree of importance in global geopolitics. Some Third World countries aligned themselves with either the US-led West or the Soviet-led Eastern bloc.

A number of countries did not fit comfortably into this neat definition of partition, including Switzerland, Sweden, Austria, and Ireland, which chose to be neutral. Finland was under the Soviet Union's military sphere of influence (see FCMA treaty) but remained neutral and was not communist, nor was it a member of the Warsaw Pact or Comecon but a member of the EFTA since 1986, and was west of the Iron Curtain. In 1955, when Austria again became a fully independent republic, it did so under the condition that it remain neutral; but as a country to the west of the Iron Curtain, it was in the United States' sphere of influence. Spain did not join the NATO until 1982, seven years after the death of the authoritarian Franco.

The 1980s advent of Mikhail Gorbachev led to the end of the Cold War following the dissolution of the Soviet Union.

Cold War II context

In a debated Cold War II, a new definition emerged inside the realm of western journalism. More specifically, Cold War II, also known as the Second Cold War, New Cold War, Cold War Redux, Cold War 2.0, and Colder War, refers to the tensions, hostilities, and political rivalry that intensified dramatically in 2014 between the Russian Federation on the one hand, and the United States, European Union, NATO and some other countries on the other hand.As Cold War II Looms, Washington Courts Nationalist, Rightwing, Catholic, Xenophobic Poland , Huffington Post, 15 October 2015. Tensions escalated in 2014 after Russia's annexation of Crimea, military intervention in Ukraine, and the 2015 Russian military intervention in the Syrian Civil War. By August 2014, both sides had implemented economic, financial, and diplomatic sanctions upon each other: virtually all Western countries, led by the US and EU, imposed restrictive measures on Russia; the latter reciprocally introduced retaliatory measures.Johanna Granville, "The Folly of Playing High-Stakes Poker with Putin: More to Lose than Gain over Ukraine."  8 May 2014.

Modern definitions

The exact scope of the Western world is somewhat subjective in nature, depending on whether cultural, economic, spiritual or political criteria are employed. It is a generally accepted Western view to recognize the existence of at least three "major worlds" (or "cultures", or "civilizations"), broadly in contrast with the Western: the Eastern world, the Arab and the African worlds, with no clearly specified boundaries. Additionally, Latin American and Orthodox European worlds are sometimes either a sub-civilization within Western civilization or separately considered "akin" to the West.

Many anthropologists, sociologists and historians oppose "the West and the Rest" in a categorical manner. The same has been done by Malthusian demographers with a sharp distinction between European and non-European family systems. Among anthropologists, this includes Durkheim, Dumont, and Lévi-Strauss.

Since the fall of the iron curtain the following countries are generally accepted as the Western world: the United States, Canada; the countries of the European Union plus the UK, Norway, Iceland and Switzerland; Australia and New Zealand.

Cultural definition

In modern usage, Western world refers to Europe and to areas whose populations largely originate from Europe, through the Age of Discovery's imperialism.

In the 20th century, Christianity declined in influence in many Western countries, mostly in the European Union where some member states have experienced falling church attendance and membership in recent years, and also elsewhere. Secularism (separating religion from politics and science) increased. However, while church attendance is in decline, in some Western countries (i.e. Italy, Poland, and Portugal), more than half of the people state that religion is important, and most Westerners nominally identify themselves as Christians (e.g. 59% in the United Kingdom) and attend church on major occasions, such as Christmas and Easter. In the Americas, Christianity continues to play an important societal role, though in areas such as Canada, a low level of religiosity is common due to a European-type secularization. The official religions of the United Kingdom and some Nordic countries are forms of Christianity, while the majority of European countries have no official religion. Despite this, Christianity, in its different forms, remains the largest faith in most Western countries.

Christianity remains the dominant religion in the Western world, where 70% are Christians. A 2011 Pew Research Center survey found that 76.2% of Europeans, 73.3% in Oceania, and about 86.0% in the Americas (90% in Latin America and the Caribbean and 77.4% in Northern America) described themselves as Christians.

Countries in the Western world are also the most keen on digital and televisual media technologies, as they were in the postwar period on television and radio: from 2000 to 2014, the Internet's market penetration in the West was twice that in non-Western regions. Wikipedia has been blocked intermittently in China since 2004.

Latin America

American political scientist, adviser and academic Samuel P. Huntington considered Latin America as separate from the Western world for the purpose of his geopolitical analysis. Huntington's view has, however, been contested on a number of occasions as biased. Huntington also states that, while in general researchers consider that the West has three main components (European, North American and Latin American), in his view, Latin America has followed a different development path from Europe and North America. Although it is a scion of European (mainly Spanish and Portuguese) civilization, it also incorporates, to an extent, elements of indigenous American civilizations, absent from North America and Europe. It has had a corporatist and authoritarian culture that Europe had to a much lesser extent. Both Europe and North America felt the effects of the Reformation and combined Catholic and Protestant culture. Historically, Latin America has been only Catholic, although this is changing due to the influx of Protestants into the region. Some regions in Latin America incorporate indigenous cultures, which did not exist in Europe and were effectively annihilated in the United States, and whose importance oscillates between two extremes: Mexico, Central America, Peru and Bolivia, on the one hand, and Argentina and Chile on the other. However, he does mention that the modus operandi of the Catholic Church was to incorporate native elements of pagan European cultures into the general dogma of Catholicism, and the Native American elements could be perceived in the same way.

Subjectively, Latin Americans are divided when it comes to identifying themselves. Some say: "Yes, we are part of the West." Others say: "No, we have our own unique culture"; and a vast bibliographical material produced by Latin Americans and North Americans exposes in detail their cultural differences. Huntington goes on to mention that Latin America could be considered a sub-civilization within Western civilization, or a separate civilization intimately related to the West and divided as to its belonging to it. While the second option is the most appropriate and useful for an analysis focused on the international political consequences of civilizations, including relations between Latin America, on the one hand, and North America and Europe, on the other, he also mentions that the underlying conflict of Latin America belonging to the West must eventually be addressed in order to develop a cohesive Latin American identity.

Other countries

Most of South Africa's population is not of European ancestry, excepting a sizeable minority. The primary sources of the country's constitution are Roman-Dutch mercantile law & personal law and English Common law, imports of Dutch settlement and British colonialism respectively. English, the country's lingua franca, is the main language used in official and business capacities and the sole language of record in South African courts. English and Afrikaans – most similar to Dutch – are two of South Africa's eleven official languages. Christianity is the dominant religion and many denominations incorporate worship practices from traditional African religions. The Methodist, Roman Catholic, Anglican, Dutch Reformed, Lutheran, Pentecostal and Seventh-day Adventist dominations are also popular.

The Philippines, although geographically part of the Eastern world and having a majority population that does not possess European ethnic origins aside from a significant minority, maintains strong Western-based influences in its culture. Cape Verde also has significant influence from the Western world due to Portuguese colonization, seen through the country's language (Portuguese), music, art and the prevalence of Christianity. The country's population is also overall, a mixture of African and European descent. European influence is also evident in Namibia, which has a sizeable minority of European descent and was previously administered by Germany and then South Africa.

Economic definition

The term "Western world" is sometimes interchangeably used with the term First World or developed countries, stressing the difference between First World and the Third World or developing countries. This usage occurs despite the fact that many countries that may be culturally Western are developing countries – in fact, a significant percentage of the Americas are developing countries. It is also used despite many developed countries or regions not being culturally Western (e.g. Japan, Singapore, South Korea, Taiwan, Hong Kong, and Macao). Privatization policies (involving government enterprises and public services) and multinational corporations are often considered a visible sign of Western nations' economic presence, especially in Third World countries, and represent a common institutional environment for powerful politicians, enterprises, trade unions and firms, bankers and thinkers of the Western world.James C. W. Ahiakpor, "Multinational Corporations in the Third World: Predators or Allies in Economic Development?" 20 July 2010 .Jackson J. Spielvogel, "Western Civilization: A Brief History, Volume II: Since 1500" 2016.

Views on torn countries
According to Samuel P. Huntington, some countries are torn on whether they are Western or not, with typically the national leadership pushing for Westernization, while historical, cultural and traditional forces remain largely non-Western. These include Turkey, whose political leadership has since the 1920s tried to Westernize the predominantly Muslim country with only 3% of its territory within Europe. It is his chief example of a "torn country" that is attempting to join Western civilization. The country's elite started the Westernization efforts, beginning with Mustafa Kemal Atatürk, who took power as the first president of the modern Turkish nation-state in 1923, imposed western institutions and dress, removed the Arabic alphabet and embraced the Latin alphabet. It joined NATO and since the 1960s has been seeking to join the European Union with very slow progress.

Other views
A series of scholars of civilization, including Arnold J. Toynbee, Alfred Kroeber and Carroll Quigley have identified and analyzed "Western civilization" as one of the civilizations that have historically existed and still exist today. Toynbee entered into quite an expansive mode, including as candidates those countries or cultures who became so heavily influenced by the West as to adopt these borrowings into their very self-identity. Carried to its limit, this would in practice include almost everyone within the West, in one way or another. In particular, Toynbee refers to the intelligentsia'' formed among the educated elite of countries impacted by the European expansion of centuries past. While often pointedly nationalist, these cultural and political leaders interacted within the West to such an extent as to change both themselves and the West.

The theologian and paleontologist Pierre Teilhard de Chardin conceived of the West as the set of civilizations descended from the Nile Valley Civilization of Egypt.

Palestinian-American literary critic Edward Said uses the term "Occident" in his discussion of Orientalism. According to his binary, the West, or Occident, created a romanticized vision of the East, or Orient, to justify colonial and imperialist intentions. This Occident-Orient binary focuses on the Western vision of the East instead of any truths about the East. His theories are rooted in Hegel's master-slave dialectic: The Occident would not exist without the Orient and vice versa. Further, Western writers created this irrational, feminine, weak "Other" to contrast with the rational, masculine, strong West because of a need to create a difference between the two that would justify imperialist ambitions, according to the Said-influenced Indian-American theorist Homi K. Bhabha.

See also

 Americanization
 Americas
 Anglicisation
 Anglophone
 Atlanticism
 Eastern world
 East–West dichotomy
 Europeanisation
 Far West
 First World
 Francophonie
 Free world
 Global North and Global South
 Golden billion
 Hispanophone
 History of Western civilization
 Maghreb
 Mid-Atlantic English
 Monroe Doctrine
 Three-world model
 Western esotericism
 Western hemisphere
 Western philosophy
 Western civilization
 Anti-Western sentiment

 Organisations
 European Council
 European Economic Area (EEA)
 European Union (EU)
 G10 currencies
 Group of Seven (G7)
 Group of Twelve (G12)
 North Atlantic Treaty Organization (NATO)

 Representation in the United Nations
 Eastern European Group
 Western European and Others Group

Bibliography

Notes

References

Further reading
 
 
 Bavaj, Riccardo: "The West": A Conceptual Exploration , European History Online, Mainz: Institute of European History, 2011, retrieved: 28 November 2011.
 Conze, Vanessa, Abendland, EGO - European History Online, Mainz: Institute of European History, 2017, retrieved: 8 March 2021 (pdf).
 Daly, Jonathan. "The Rise of Western Power: A Comparative History of Western Civilization " (London and New York: Bloomsbury, 2014). .
 Daly, Jonathan. "Historians Debate the Rise of the West" (London and New York: Routledge, 2015). .
 The Western Tradition homepage at Annenberg/CPB  – where you can watch each episode on demand for free (Pop-ups required). Videos are also available as a YouTube playlist.
 J. F. C. Fuller. A Military History of the Western World. Three Volumes. New York: Da Capo Press, Inc., 1987 and 1988.
 V. 1. From the earliest times to the Battle of Lepanto; .
 V. 2. From the defeat of the Spanish Armada to the Battle of Waterloo; .
 V. 3. From the American Civil War to the end of World War II; .
 
 

Modern civilizations
Country classifications
Cultural concepts
Cultural regions
European civilizations
Historiography of Europe
Western culture